Tiberius Claudius Cleobulus (165–213AD) was a Roman senator.

Life
He held the position of suffect consul for one nundinium around 210.

Claudius was the son of an earlier Tiberius Claudius Cleobulus (c.135-c.180) and wife Acilia, the daughter of Manius Acilius Glabrio Gnaeus Cornelius Severus and wife ... Faustina. He married his first cousin, Acilia Frestana, who was the daughter of Manius Acilius Glabrio, consul in 186, and paternal niece of Acilia. Tiberius Claudius Cleobulus and his wife Acilia Frestana together had Claudia Acilia Priscilliana, who would later marry Lucius Valerius Messalla. He also had a son, Claudius Acilius Cleobulus.

References

Bibliography 
 
 
 

2nd-century Romans
3rd-century Romans
Imperial Roman consuls
165 births
213 deaths
Claudius Cleobulus